Leylah Annie Fernandez (born 6 September 2002) is a Canadian professional tennis player. She has a career-high ranking of No. 13 by the Women's Tennis Association (WTA), achieved on 8 August 2022. Fernandez won her first WTA Tour title at the 2021 Monterrey Open. As a 19-year-old, she finished runner-up at the 2021 US Open to fellow teenager Emma Raducanu, defeating three top-5 players en route to the final (including defending champion Naomi Osaka).

Early life
Fernandez was born in Montreal, Quebec. Her father Jorge is from Ecuador and is a former soccer player. Her mother Irene (née Exevea) is a Filipino Canadian. Her younger sister Bianca Jolie is also a tennis player.

Junior career
On 25 January 2019, as a 16-year old, Fernandez entered the Australian Open girls' singles final, where she lost to the top-seeded Clara Tauson. On 8 June 2019, Fernandez defeated Emma Navarro in the French Open final to become the first Canadian female winner of a junior Grand Slam title since Eugenie Bouchard at the 2012 Wimbledon Championships.

Professional career

2019: Professional debut
On 21 July 2019, Fernandez won her first professional singles tennis title when she rallied to beat fellow Canadian Carson Branstine in the final of the Gatineau Challenger. Fernandez also won her first professional doubles title on the same date when she teamed with Rebecca Marino of Vancouver. The pair defeated the second-seeded team of Marcela Zacarías of Mexico and Hsu Chieh-yu of Taiwan. The following week, she made her second consecutive ITF final in Granby, losing to Lizette Cabrera of Australia.

2020: Grand Slam debut, first final on WTA Tour, French Open 3rd round
Fernandez made her Grand Slam debut at the Australian Open. After qualifying, she lost in the first round to Lauren Davis.

She achieved the biggest win of her career the following week in the Billie Jean King Cup qualifying round against world No. 5, Belinda Bencic.

In late February at the Mexican Open, she qualified and reached her first WTA tournament final, where, after winning 12 sets in a row, she was defeated by world No. 69, Heather Watson. A week later, she upset Grand Slam champion Sloane Stephens to reach the quarterfinals of the Monterrey Open, losing to the eventual champion, Elina Svitolina.

In October at the French Open, Fernandez reached the third round, first by upsetting 31st seed Magda Linette in the opening round, and then defeating Polona Hercog before losing to Petra Kvitová, in straight sets.

2021: First WTA title, US Open final & Indian Wells debut

Fernandez began 2021 without consecutive wins in her first four tournaments. However, in March at the Monterrey Open, she won her first four matches to reach the final, defeating Viktorija Golubic to win the first WTA title of her career. At 18 years old, she was the youngest player in the main draw, and won without dropping a set during the tournament.

At the US Open, Fernandez became a fan favorite due to her unexpected success as an underdog. She defeated the third seed and defending champion, Naomi Osaka, in three sets in the third round, former world No. 1 and three-time major champion, Angelique Kerber, in the fourth round, in three sets, and fifth seed Elina Svitolina in the quarterfinals, again in three sets, to reach her maiden major semifinal a day after her 19th birthday. She then defeated Aryna Sabalenka, the second seed, to reach her first major final and also the first player born in 2002 to reach such a final. It was the third time in the Open Era that a woman defeated three of the top five seeds at the US Open. In the final, she lost to fellow teenager Emma Raducanu in straight sets.

Fernandez then made her Indian Wells Open debut as the 23rd seed. She first beat Alizé Cornet in the second round and French Open finalist Anastasia Pavlyuchenkova in the third, before suffering an upset in round four by Shelby Rogers.

At the end of the year, Fernandez was given the Bobbie Rosenfeld Award by the Canadian Press as its choice for Canadian female athlete of 2021.

2022: Second Monterrey title, French Open QF & WTA 1000 doubles SF
Fernandez started the season at the Adelaide International. She advanced to the round of 16 where she was defeated by Iga Świątek, in straight sets. She lost to Maddison Inglis in the opening round of the Australian Open as the 23rd seed.

In March, Fernandez defended her Monterrey Open title, reaching her fourth final and winning her second WTA title. Beating Anna Karolína Schmiedlová, Zheng Qinwen, Wang Qiang and Beatriz Haddad Maia to reach the final, Fernandez won against Camila Osorio in three sets, saving five championship points in the final set. She also entered the doubles competition with her sister, Bianca Fernandez. They lost in the first round to Elixane Lechemia and Ingrid Neel.

Fernandez subsequently entered the Indian Wells Open. Receiving a bye in the first round, she advanced to third round after a retirement from Amanda Anisimova, where she won the second-set tiebreak, and defeated Shelby Rogers in three sets. She lost to defending champion Paula Badosa in the fourth round. In the doubles competition, partnering with Alizé Cornet, the pair reached semifinals, before losing to eventual champions Xu Yifan and Yang Zhaoxuan.

In May, at the French Open, Fernandez beat Olympic champion Belinda Bencic and 2019 French Open semifinalist Amanda Anisimova in the third and fourth round, before losing to Martina Trevisan in the quarterfinals.

A Grade-III-fractured foot acquired during her quarterfinal match with Trevisan forced her to miss Wimbledon, after a first-round exit the previous year to Ostapenko.

At the Canadian Open, Fernandez lost in the second round to eventual finalist Beatriz Haddad Maia. At the Cincinnati Open, she lost in the first round to Ekaterina Alexandrova.

Fernandez entered the US Open seeded 14th. In her opening round, she beat Océane Dodin, before losing to Liudmila Samsonova in the second. With the loss of most of her points from reaching the final last year, Fernandez is set to fall outside of the top 30. In the doubles draw, pairing with Daria Saville, she reached the second round, and with Jack Sock in the mixed doubles the quarterfinals.

2023
Fernandez started the 2023 season by reaching quarterfinals at the Auckland Open. At the Australian Open, she won her first-round match against Alizé Cornet. In the second round, she lost to world No. 4, Caroline Garcia, in a hard-fought match, having set points in both sets.

Personal life
Fernandez is a fan of Spanish football team Real Madrid, and English football team Manchester City.
She speaks fluent English, French and Spanish.

Endorsements
Fernandez is sponsored by Canadian brand Lululemon for apparel and by French brand Babolat for racquets, currently using the Babolat Pure Aero racquet. In January 2022, she became the first global brand ambassador in tennis for Lululemon. Lululemon replaces her prior apparel sponsor Asics, which she will continue to use for footwear until Lululemon launches its tennis footwear line by the end of 2022. She is also sponsored by wireless telecommunications company Telcel/Claro, cosmetics company Birchbox, Morgan Stanley, and EasyPost. She also is a brand ambassador for Flair Airlines along with fellow Canadians Eugenie Bouchard and Felix Auger Aliassime. Additional sponsors include USANA, Microsure, and Cambridge Global Payments. In January 2022, she became a Google ambassador in Canada for the Google Pixel 6 and Pixel 6 Pro as well as Gatorade Canada ambassador.

Performance timelines

Only main-draw results in WTA Tour, Grand Slam tournaments, Billie Jean King Cup and Olympic Games are included in win–loss records.

Singles
Current after the 2023 Dubai Open.

Doubles
Current through the 2023 Dubai Open.

Grand Slam tournament finals

Singles: 1 (runner up)

WTA career finals

Singles: 4 (2 titles, 2 runner-ups)

Doubles: 1 (runner-up)

ITF Circuit finals

Singles: 3 (1 title, 2 runner–ups)

Doubles: 4 (2 titles, 2 runner-ups)

Junior Grand Slam tournament finals

Girls' singles: 2 (1 title, 1 runner–up)

WTA Tour career earnings
As of 7 March 2022

Career Grand Slam statistics

Seedings
The tournaments won by Fernandez are in boldface, and advanced into finals by Fernandez are in italics.

Best Grand Slam singles results details

Head-to-head records

Record vs. top-10 ranked players
Active players are in boldface.

Record against No. 11–20 players
Fernandez's record against players who have been ranked world No. 11–20. Active players are in boldface:

  Varvara Lepchenko 
  Anastasia Pavlyuchenkova 
  Alizé Cornet 
  Kaia Kanepi 
  Wang Qiang 
  Ana Konjuh 
  Elise Mertens 
  Karolína Muchová 
  Alison Riske 
  Markéta Vondroušová 
  Mihaela Buzărnescu

Top 10 wins

Notes

References

External links
 
 
 

2002 births
Living people
Canadian female tennis players
Sportspeople from Laval, Quebec
Tennis players from Montreal
French Open junior champions
Canadian sportspeople of Filipino descent
Canadian people of Ecuadorian descent
Sportspeople of Ecuadorian descent
Grand Slam (tennis) champions in girls' singles
Tennis players at the 2020 Summer Olympics
Olympic tennis players of Canada
21st-century Canadian women